Palmyra Area Senior High School (typically referred to as Palmyra High School or PHS) is a midsized public high school located in Palmyra, Pennsylvania, in the United States. It is part of the Palmyra Area School District. The school is located at 1125 Park Drive in North Londonderry Township and serves students from the western part of Lebanon County, Pennsylvania and includes: Palmyra, North Londonderry Township, South Londonderry Township, the villages of Campbelltown, Lawn, Colebrook, and Mount Gretna. The school was founded in 1962.

In the 2018–2019 school year, Palmyra Area Senior High School had 1,141 students grades 9th through 12th.

Renovations
The Palmyra Area High School underwent a $35 million renovation to the existing school, as well as additions in 2007. Due to a population increase in the Palmyra area, school officials decided that the aging building could no longer support the projected increase in students. The School Board decided a renovation with additions was more sensible than building a new school.

The first phase was the construction of a new 15 classroom, 2 story addition to the existing school. This was completed in December 2006, and held student occupation on January 2, 2007. Also, the new cafeteria was completed for January 23, 2007.
Additions included; a new two story, 15-classroom wing, new weight training center, new art rooms, a new cafeteria and new communication and production technology classrooms.

Despite the large amount of progress with the project, work was stopped suddenly both on renovations and in the classrooms. On Monday April 9, 2007 at about 8:50AM, a fire broke out on a Tar Roofing Machine on the north end of the campus, by the new wing. An immediate evacuation of nearby classrooms into the gymnasium was conducted for a short time, and nearby propane tanks which fueled the device were removed. Local fire services arrived shortly thereafter and extinguished the fire. Exhaust and smoke then moved into the school building and covered windows and vehicles.  The event caused a minor delay in the school schedule.

Phase III was completed at the end of summer 2007.  It included the renovations of the Business Department Wing, which went under renovation on April 17, 2007. Also, the new Library opened, in the area of the old Kitchen and Production Technology Room.  Additional miscellaneous classrooms opened in the old cafeteria location.

Extracurriculars
The school offers a variety of clubs, activities and an extensive sports program. The school colors of the district are Black, Orange, and White. The school mascot is the Cougar.

Athletics
Palmyra competes in District III of the Pennsylvania Interscholastic Athletic Association (PIAA). Palmyra fields teams in the following Mid Penn Keystone Division of the Mid Penn Conference

Boys
Baseball – AAA (2013 District III playoff qualifier)
Basketball- AAA (2013 District III runner-up) 
Cross Country – AA
Football – AAA (2015 District III playoff qualifier) 
Golf – AAA
Lacrosse – AAAA
Soccer – AA (2007 AA State Champions)
Swimming and Diving – AA (3rd place 2013 District III Championships, 6 state qualifiers)
Tennis – AA
Track and Field – AAA
Volleyball
 Wrestling	 – AAA

Girls
Basketball – AAAA (2014 District III Runner-Up)
Cross Country – AAA (2013 PIAA Class AA Champions) 
Field Hockey – AAA (2015 District III Champions, 2015 PIAA AAA Runner Up) 
Golf – AAA
Lacrosse – AAAA
Soccer (Fall) – AAA
Softball – AAAA
Swimming and Diving – AAA (4th place 2013 District III Championships, 8 state qualifiers) 
Girls' Tennis – AAA
Track and Field – AAA
Volleyball – AAA

Baseball – District III Champions (1999, 2002, 2003) PIAA State Champions (1999)
Field Hockey – District III Champions (1984, 1991, 2001, 2002, 2004, 2005, 2007, 2011, 2013, 2015) PIAA State Champions (2005, 2014) 
Girls Basketball- District III Champions (2013)
Girls Cross Country- District III Champions (2012)
Boys Basketball- District III Champions (1949, 1957, 1996)
Boys Soccer- District III Champions (2008)
Boys Track and Field- District III Champions (1999)(1971)

Clubs and activities
Student activities at Palmyra High School include:

 ACTS Club
 Art Club
 Band
 Color guard
 Chess Club
 Chorus
 Computer club (defunct as of January 2007)
 Envirothon
 Family and consumer science club
 FBLA
 FIRST Robotics team 2539
 GSA / SAGA
 Key Club
 Spring Musical (Big Fish in Spring 2023)
 Orchestra
 Palm Echo Yearbook
 Play (Theater)
 National Honor Society
 Robotics Club
 Student Council
 Medical Careers Club
 The Cougar Chronicle Student Newspaper
 Youth and Government Club
 Tri-M

References

External links
 Palmyra Area School District Official Web Site.
 PHS Official Web Site.
 Palmyra Area High School at Public School Review.
 Pennsylvania Department of Education Website

Educational institutions established in 1962
High schools in Central Pennsylvania
Schools in Lebanon County, Pennsylvania
Public high schools in Pennsylvania
1962 establishments in Pennsylvania